Paraguayan foreign policy has concentrated on maintaining good relations with its neighbors, and it has been an active proponent of regional co-operation. It is a member of the United Nations and has served one term in the UN Security Council in 1967-1969. It maintains membership in several international financial institutions, including the World Bank, the Inter-American Development Bank, and the International Monetary Fund. It also belongs to the Organization of American States, the Latin American Integration Association (ALADI), the Rio Group, INTERPOL, MERCOSUR (the Southern Cone Common Market) and UNASUR.

At the political level, diplomatic affairs and international relations of Paraguay are officially handled by the Ministry of Foreign Relations, which answers to the executive branch of the government.  Minister of Foreign Relations 2018 -2019 was Luis Alberto Castiglioni.

Unlike any other country in South America, Paraguay recognizes the Republic of China instead of the People's Republic of China. Paraguay presently is the largest country maintaining official diplomatic relations with the Republic of China.

Bilateral Relations

Africa

Americas

Asia

Europe

Oceania

International organizations 
Paraguay is a member of the following international organizations:

CAN (associate), FAO, G-11, G-77, IADB, IAEA, IBRD (also known as the World Bank), ICAO, ICCt, ICRM, IDA, IFAD, IFC, IFRCS, ILO, IMF, IMO, Interpol,  IOC, IOM, IPU, ISO (correspondent), ITSO, ITU, ITUC, LAES, LAIA, Mercosur, MIGA, MINURSO, MINUSTAH, MONUSCO, NAM (observer), OAS, OPANAL, OPCW, PCA, Rio Group, UN, UNASUR, UNCTAD, UNESCO, UNFICYP, UNIDO, Union Latina, UNMIL, UNMIS, UNOCI, UNWTO, UPU, WCO, WHO, WIPO, WMO, WTO

See also
 List of diplomatic missions in Paraguay
 List of diplomatic missions of Paraguay

References

External links
Foreign Ministry of Paraguay